Ciara Maurizia Horne (born 17 September 1989) is a British racing cyclist. Having formerly represented Ireland at an international level, Horne has switched nationality and currently rides on the track for the Welsh Cycling backed Team USN, and also races on the road for the Breast Cancer Care racing team. Horne formed part of the Great Britain team who became 2014 European champions in the team pursuit.

Career
Horne was brought up in Kenilworth, near Coventry, Warwickshire, and attended Stratford Girls' Grammar School, Horne obtained a First Class degree in Physiotherapy from the University of Birmingham in 2013.

Horne began her sporting life at the age of 7 as a swimmer. She competed at the national level until the age of 16 when she suffered a serious shoulder injury which required surgery. This prompted her to switch to triathlon, getting onto the world class start programme and competing at Salford Junior world cup where she finished 8th. However, plagued by injuries, Horne found that the majority of her training would be in the form of cycling and her love for the sport was born.  Horne finally joined a cycling team in October 2009.

Horne qualified to represent Ireland through her mother. In July 2012, Horne renounced her Irish citizenship. Having held dual nationality, Horne qualified for a British racing licence through British Cycling. Horne's father was born in Barry, Vale of Glamorgan, Wales, she was therefore offered the opportunity to train with the Welsh Cycling Squad.

Horne represented Wales at the Commonwealth Games in Glasgow, 2014, competing in the time trial and individual pursuit.

Ciara has a younger brother called Conair who loves a recon on Warzone Call of Duty. She is engaged to racing cyclist Lewis Oliva.

Palmarès

2011
2nd 500m time trial, Irish National Track Championships
2nd Pursuit, Irish National Track Championships
2nd Scratch race, Irish National Track Championships

2012
2nd Team Pursuit, Round 1 2012–2013 Track World Cup, Cali (with Amy Roberts & Elinor Barker)

2013
Revolution
1st Scratch Race
3rd Points Race
3rd Team Pursuit, Round 3 2012–2013 Track World Cup, Aguascalientes (with Amy Roberts & Elinor Barker)

2014
1st  Team pursuit, European Track Championships
1st Team Pursuit, Track Cycling World Cup, Round 1, Guadalajara (with Laura Trott, Elinor Barker & Amy Roberts)
1st Team Pursuit, Track Cycling World Cup, Round 2, London (with Laura Trott, Elinor Barker & Katie Archibald)
2nd Team pursuit, British National Track Championships (with Katie Archibald, Sarah Storey & Anna Turvey)

2015
UEC European Track Championships
1st  Team pursuit
3rd Individual Pursuit 
1st Team pursuit, British National Track Championships (with Katie Archibald, Sarah Storey & Joanna Rowsell)
2nd Overall Tour of the Reservoir
2nd Individual Pursuit, Revolution – Round 1, Derby
3rd Individual pursuit, British National Track Championships

2016
 3rd  Team pursuit, UCI Track World Championships
 3rd  Team time trial, UCI Road World Championships

References

External links

1989 births
Living people
People from Warwickshire
British female cyclists
Welsh female cyclists
Irish female cyclists
Alumni of the University of Birmingham
Cyclists at the 2014 Commonwealth Games
Commonwealth Games competitors for Wales
Cyclists at the 2016 Summer Olympics
Olympic cyclists of Great Britain